Area D (also known as Danger Island in a 2002 re-release) is a first-person adventure and puzzle FMV video game. It was developed by Dosch Design, published by ARI Data CD GmbH, and released in 1997 in Germany for Microsoft Windows. The following year, it was released in other European countries. It follows a skilled adventurer who is sent to find a team of scientists sent into the Amazon, eventually being forced to fight dinosaurs in order to rescue them. The game was critically panned for most aspects, including its acting and writing.

Reception 
PC Games rated the game 28/100, calling the graphics good but saying that the lack of animations made it look outdated. They also criticized the lack of puzzles.

PC Player rated the game 19/100, joking that the game itself "wiped out the dinosaurs" due to its "monotonous" dialogue and questioning whether the actors were "professionals" as the game's advertising claimed.

Absolute Games rated the game 10/100, saying that while the game costed six times less than any average game, it was also accordingly six times worse, and called the writing "second-grade" level.

References

External links 

 

1997 video games
Amazon in fiction
Dinosaurs in video games
Europe-exclusive video games
First-person adventure games
Full motion video based games
Single-player video games
Video games developed in Germany
Video games set in forests
Video games set in South America
Windows games
Windows-only games